Toronto City Council is the governing body of the municipal government of Toronto, Ontario. Meeting at Toronto City Hall, it comprises 25 city councillors and the mayor of Toronto. The current term began on November 15, 2022.

Structure
The current decision-making framework and committee structure at the City of Toronto was established by the City of Toronto Act, 2006 and came into force January 1, 2007. The decision-making process at the City of Toronto involves committees that report to City Council. Committees propose, review and debate policies and recommendations before their arrival at City Council for debate. Citizens and residents can only make deputations on policy at committees, citizens cannot make public presentations to City Council. The mayor is a member of all committees and is entitled to one vote.

There are three types of committees at the City of Toronto: the Executive Committee, four other standing committees, and special committees of council.

Executive committee 
The Executive Committee is an advisory body chaired by the mayor. The Executive Committee is composed of the mayor, deputy mayor, and the chairs of the four standing committees who are appointed by the mayor and three "at-large" members appointed by City Council. The role of the Executive Committee is to set the City of Toronto's priorities, manage financial planning and budgeting, labour relations, human resources, and the operation of City Council. The committee existed in the old City of Toronto beginning in 1969. Before that Toronto had a Board of Control, as did former cities North York and Etobicoke.

The Executive Committee makes recommendations to city council on:
 strategic policy and priorities
 governance policy and structure
 financial planning and budgeting
 fiscal policy (revenue and tax policies)
 intergovernmental and international relations
 Council operation
 Human resources and labour relations

Other committees 
Following the sudden decision by the provincial government to reduce the size of City Council in summer 2018, the committee structure is currently under review; what follows describes the structure up to December 1, 2018. There were eleven other committees that reported to Toronto City Council. The seven standing policy committees were:

There are four other committees that report to Council:

Source: City of Toronto

Community councils
All members of Toronto City Council serve on a community council. Community councils report to City Council but they also have final decision-making power on certain items, such as front yard parking and appointments to local boards and Business Improvement Areas. The city is divided into four community councils. Their meeting locations are as follows:

 Etobicoke and York – Etobicoke Civic Centre
 North York – North York Civic Centre
 Scarborough – Scarborough Civic Centre
 Toronto and East York – Toronto City Hall

2022–2026 City Council
The current council term began on November 15, 2022.

Present composition of Toronto City Council

Vacancies
Vacancies in a council seat may be filled in one of two ways, either by the holding of a by-election or through direct appointment of an interim councillor chosen by the council in an internal vote. Normally the council is allowed to decide which process to follow in each individual case; however, if the vacancy occurs after March 31 in the year of a regularly scheduled municipal election, then the vacancy must be filled by direct appointment as provincial law prohibits the holding of a by-election in the final six months of a council term.

The process often results in public debate, however. The by-election process is widely seen as more democratic, while the appointment process is seen as less expensive for the city to undertake.

When the appointment process is followed, people who are interested in the appointment are asked to submit their names to the local community council for the area where the vacant seat is located; the community council then evaluates and interviews the applicants, and submits a recommendation to the full city council for a final vote. The full council can, however, reject the community council's recommendation and choose a different candidate instead; in 2013, for example, the city council passed over former member of Provincial Parliament (MPP) Chris Stockwell, the recommended candidate of the Etobicoke Community Council, in favour of Peter Leon.

Normally, a condition of the application process is that the appointed interim councillor does not run as a candidate in the next regular election, so that the appointed councillor does not gain an unfair incumbency advantage. There have, nonetheless, been instances in which appointed interim councillors have tested the rule; most notably, Paul Ainslie did so in 2006 by running for re-election in a different ward than the one where he had been appointed, and after the ward boundaries were adjusted in 2018, former ward 28 councillor Lucy Troisi ran in the new ward 13 against the former ward 27's elected incumbent Kristyn Wong-Tam. Peter Leon considered registering as a candidate in the 2014 election following his appointment as an interim councillor in 2013, but ultimately did not do so.

If a full byelection is pursued, however, then the winner of that by-election is not barred from running in the next regular municipal election.

In the event of a vacancy in the mayor's office, the deputy mayor is immediately elevated to acting mayor on an interim basis until the permanent new mayor is selected in a by-election. Unlike a city council seat, however, a by-election must always be held, unless the vacancy occurs less than 90 days before a regular municipal election. The situation does not trigger additional council vacancies, however; the deputy mayor is not deemed to have vacated their council seat during the acting period, and a sitting councillor who runs in the mayoral by-election does not have to resign his or her council seat unless he or she wins the election.

Three vacancies occurred during the 2010-14 council term. Doug Holyday resigned from council in 2013 after winning election to the Legislative Assembly of Ontario in a byelection, and was succeeded by Peter Leon. Adam Vaughan resigned from council in 2014 to contest a federal byelection for the House of Commons, and was succeeded by Ceta Ramkhalawansingh. Peter Milczyn resigned in 2014 after winning election to the Legislative Assembly of Ontario in the 2014 election and was succeeded by James Maloney.

Since amalgamation there are four instances that a councillor died while in office:

 Frank Faubert - ward 16 councillor and former mayor of Scarborough died in 1999 (after about a year and a half into his council term). The seat was filled with by-election: filled by former Ward 43 councillor David Soknacki.
 Rob Ford - ward 2 councillor and former mayor of Toronto died in 2016, one year and three months into his council term. The seat was filled with by-election: won by Ford's nephew and former Ward 1 public school trustee Michael Ford.
 Ron Moeser - ward 44 councillor and former Scarborough councillor died on April 18, 2017. The seat filled by an appointment with former city staffer Jim Hart.
 Pam McConnell - ward 28 councillor died on July 7, 2017, after being hospitalized for a health complication. The vacancy was filled by voting by members of council, who selected Lucy Troisi over rival Michael Creek.

Compensation 
The Toronto Municipal Code, Chapter 223 sets the salary of the mayor and city councillors and is annually adjusted to the Consumer Price Index (CPI). In 2022, the salary of a councillor is $120,502.20 and the salary of the mayor is $202,948.20.

Staff

City Clerk of Toronto
The city clerk is the senior administrative officer of the municipal government of Toronto. The city clerk is charged with building public trust and confidence in the city government.

There are five divisions in the Clerk's office:

 Corporate Information Management Services - Executive Director and Administrative Assistant, two analysts
 Council and Support Services
 Elections and Registry Services
 Protocol Services
 Secretariat

City clerk staff are seated in the horseshoe shaped table located in front of the speaker's podium in the council chambers.

Sergeant-at-Arms 
City Council has a sergeant-at-arms, who is present at each council and committee meeting as per Toronto Municipal Code Chapter 27-50 to ensure order and safety of all members. In 2014 a second post was created to have two sergeants-at-arms present during council meetings. They are posted on the floor or near the entrances beside the speaker's desk.

History

Original ward system

Toronto was divided into a group of wards, each named after a Christian saint. In 1834, the city had five wards and the number of wards would expand to nine by 1891. While out of use for over a century, these ward names continue to appear in neighbourhood names and subway stations and, until the 1990s, provincial electoral districts. The old wards and their boundaries in their final form, used from 1871 to 1891, were:

 St. Andrew's (named for Saint Andrew)- bounded by Dufferin, King, Queen, and Yonge Streets – St. Andrew's Church (Toronto) is located within the ward
 St. David's (named for Saint David) – bounded by Ontario, Don Mills Road (now Broadview Ave), Bloor and Queen
 St. George's (named for Saint George) – bounded by King, Yonge, Dufferin Streets and lakefront
 St. Lawrence's (named for Lawrence of Rome) – bounded by Queen, Yonge, lakefront, McGee
 St. Patrick's (named for Saint Patrick) – bounded by Bloor, Bathurst, Queen and College Streets (now part of Trinity-Spadina) – St. Patrick's Church is located within this ward
 St. John's (either for John the Apostle or John the Baptist) – bounded by Yonge, University, Bloor and Queen. The area would continue to be known as The Ward up to the mid-20th century.
 St. Stephen's (named for Saint Stephen) – bounded by Bathurst, Bloor, Queen and Dufferin Streets
 St. Thomas's (named for Thomas the Apostle) – bounded by Jarvis, Ontario, Bloor, Queen Streets
 St. James's (named for James, son of Zebedee) – bounded by Yonge, Jarvis, King and Bloor – Cathedral Church of St. James is located within the ward

By 1891, there were 13 wards, with three aldermen elected per ward: St. Alban's, St. Andrew's, St. David's, St. George's, St. James's, St. John's, St. Lawrence's, St. Mark's, St. Matthew's, St. Patrick's, St. Paul's, St. Stephen's, and St. Thomas's.

When Yorkville was annexed in 1883, it became St. Paul's Ward (named for Paul the Apostle or Saint Paul). When Riverdale was annexed in 1884, it became St. Matthew's Ward (named for Matthew the Apostle or Saint Matthew). Brockton was also annexed in 1884, and it became the ward of St. Mark's (named for Mark the Evangelist or Saint Mark). When Parkdale was annexed in 1889, it became St. Alban's Ward (named for Saint Alban).

Post-1891 ward structure

In June 1891, the city approved a re-organization to Council changing the number of wards to six; each ward was known by a number. Each ward elected four aldermen. Over the next three decades three new wards were added, one each in the north, east, and west, as new areas were annexed to the City of Toronto. In 1896, the Board of Control executive branch of Council was established to handle all daily council business and report to Council. Mayor Robert John Fleming presided over the first Board of Control.

Eventually, the numbers of aldermen was reduced to two aldermen per ward as the number of wards was increased. When a higher level of municipal government, Metro Toronto, was introduced in 1953, the alderman with the most votes of the two elected councillors from each ward was also a member of Metro Council.

Until 1955 municipal elections were held annually, either on New Year's Day or on the first Monday in December. In 1955 council moved to two-year terms, and in 1982 three-year terms were introduced. Along with the other municipalities of Ontario, Toronto moved to a four-year municipal term in 2006.

Starting in 1904 the Board of Control was elected directly. Until 1969 there was a four-person Board of Control in addition to city council. The board was elected at large across the city, and its members had considerably more power than the city councillors. In 1969, the Board of Control was abolished and the four controllers were replaced by four new councillors from two new wards. The ward map was rebalanced to give more equitable representation.

In 1985, the system of electing Metro councillors was changed so that two separate ballots were held in each ward, one for the city the other for Metro. In the next election, a separate set of wards was established for Metro councillors. Each Metro ward consisted of two city wards, each electing only one councillor.

With the amalgamation of the City of Toronto with the suburban municipalities of Metro in 1997, the councils of the six former cities were abolished. The new council for the "megacity" kept the ward map of Metro Toronto but doubled the number of councillors by adopting the system of electing two councillors from each ward. East York had only one ward and was thus greatly underrepresented. Former East York mayor Michael Prue lobbied successfully for a third councillor to be elected from that ward, and this was implemented mid-term.

This system was only used for the first megacity election. In 2000 a new ward map was devised based on the federal ridings (electoral districts) that covered Toronto. Each riding was split in half to create the current system of 44 wards.

List of ward changes 1909-1988

 From 1892 until 1909 wards consisted of:
Ward 1 Riverdale
Ward 2 East Downtown and Rosedale
Ward 3 West Downtown and Summerhill
Ward 4 The Annex, Kensington Market and Garment District
Ward 5 Trinity-Bellwoods
Ward 6 Davenport and Parkdale
 1910 Ward 7 West Toronto Junction added
 1919 Ward 8 East Toronto added
 1932 Ward 9 North Toronto added
 1969 wards: new ward names; Wards 10 and 11 added
Ward 1 Swansea and Bloor West Village - formerly Riverdale 
Ward 2 Parkdale and Brockton - formerly East Downtown and Rosedale 
Ward 3 Davenport and Corsa Italia - formerly West Downtown and Summerhill 
Ward 4 Trinity-Bellwoods Little Italy - formerly The Annex, Kensington Market and Garment District
Ward 5 The Annex and Yorkville - formerly Trinity-Bellwoods 
Ward 6 Financial District, University of Toronto - formerly Davenport and Parkdale
Ward 7 Regent Park and Riverdale - formerly West Toronto Junction 
Ward 8 Riverdale - formerly East Toronto 
Ward 9 The Beaches - formerly North Toronto 
Ward 10 Rosedale and North Toronto
Ward 11 Forest Hill and North Toronto
1988 wards: wards renamed; Wards 12 to 16 added
Ward 1 Swansea and Bloor West Village
Ward 2 Parkdale
Ward 3 Brockton
Ward 4 Trinity-Bellwoods and Little Italy
Ward 5 Financial District and University of Toronto
Ward 6 Downtown East
Ward 7 Regent Park and Cabbagetown
Ward 8 Riverdale
Ward 9 East Danforth
Ward 10 The Beaches
Ward 11 The Junction
Ward 12 Davenport and Corsa Italia
Ward 13 The Annex and Yorkville
Ward 14 Forest Hill
Ward 15 Western North Toronto
Ward 16 Davisville and Lawrence Park
Changes for 2006–10 Council
Changes were made to the council in 2007:
 Executive Committee consisting of two city councillors and the six heads of the city committees (Policy and Finance, Administration, Planning and Transportation, Economic Development and Parks, Works, Community Services) Following the 2018 elections and the reduction in the size of Council, all committees are in the process of being restructured.
 Establishment of the speaker of Toronto City Council and deputy speaker of Toronto City Council

Current ward names since 2000

The current ward names are based on the federal and provincial electoral districts, but some no longer shared the same name as those district names have changed since 2000.

Political history

When the City of Toronto was incorporated in 1834, a city council was created. It provided direct representation in the government of Toronto to the population. The Town of York had been governed by the then-province of Upper Canada, with electoral representation in the Upper Canada assembly.

The first councils were elected yearly. Each of the five wards elected two aldermen and two common councillors by the votes of male householders. The first councils were dominated by two factions: the Family Compact and its loyalists; and the reformers under the leadership of William Lyon Mackenzie, Member of Parliament for York. Mackenzie won election to Council and was elected by Council as the city's first mayor, but was defeated in the next election, after proposing increased taxation. After the defeat of the Upper Canada Rebellion in 1837, the reformers were marginalized, as several were executed for treason, and others, such as Mackenzie, went into exile.

For the next century, the Tories dominated Toronto municipal politics, as they did the other levels in "Tory Toronto". The Tories were associated with staunch Protestantism, shown through membership in the Orange Order, and support for the Lord's Day Act of Ontario.

In the 1930s, various forms of left-wing opposition arose to the Tory-dominated council. The Co-operative Commonwealth Federation (CCF) was founded in 1932. The pro-labour social democratic party found support in various working-class areas of Toronto and several of its members were elected to city council. Unaffiliated anti-poverty activists like May Birchard also were elected to Council in this era. An important faction in Toronto politics in the 1930s and 1940s were the communists. There was considerable communist support in the downtown areas covered by Ward 4 and Ward 5, especially in the heavily Jewish areas of Kensington Market and the Garment District around Spadina Avenue and further west along College and up to Christie Pits including what is now Little Italy. The peak of communist influence was in the 1946 election when leader Stewart Smith was elected to the Board of Control and three other communists won seats on city council. With the beginning of the Cold War and staunch opposition from the other political groups, the communist presence quickly disappeared. The last communist alderman lost his seat in 1950.

The first part of the 20th century was the era of the newspaper slates. Each of the daily newspapers would endorse a full slate of candidates for office. The two most influential were the right-wing Toronto Telegram and the more left-leaning Toronto Daily Star. In the early parts of the century, the duelling papers ran the communications portion of the campaign of the candidates they supported, using yellow journalism to extol those they supported and denigrate those they opposed. The newspaper slates did not have a unified ideology: all the papers claimed to be seeking a balanced council, making sure that groups such as labour and Roman Catholics had representation on the council. Beyond these few exceptions, the slates of all the papers were largely made up of male, white, Conservative, Orangemen. Many candidates also appeared on the slates of several newspapers. With the exception of James Simpson, who became Toronto's first socialist mayor in 1935, the city's mayors were Tories in the first half of the 20th century.

The character of Toronto politics began to change in the 1950s and 1960s as the Anglo Tory lock on power faded in the increasingly diverse city. In 1952, Orangeman Allan Lamport became the first Liberal elected mayor in over 40 years. He resigned to become TTC chair and his administration was implicated in a municipal corruption scandal. In 1954, Leslie Saunders, another Orangeman became interim mayor. His staunch defence of Protestantism became an issue in the 1954 election. Nathan Phillips, a long-serving Jewish alderman, was elected mayor. He was a staunch Tory. His religion was an important issue in the election, in which his opponent proclaimed himself to be running as "Leslie Saunders, Protestant". The Orange Order influence dropped sharply. Only seven of 23 councillors elected that year were members of the Orange Order. Phillips was dubbed "Mayor of all the People" and governed in a non-partisan manner. During his term, Phillips enraged the Order by accepting funding from O'Keefe Brewing for the new O'Keefe Centre auditorium. In 1956, Phillips initiated the international architectural competition for a new City Hall.

In 1966, former CCF Member of Provincial Parliament William Dennison was elected mayor. He was an Orangeman and the last member of the Orange Order to be a Toronto mayor.

In the late 1960s and 1970s, a new division arose on city council between two groups that became known as the "Reformers" and the "Old Guard". Both groups crossed party lines and were divided by their approach to urban issues. The Reform faction arose in opposition to the urban renewal schemes that had been in favour in the previous decades. Two key battles were over the proposal for the Spadina Expressway and the replacement of the Trefann Court neighbourhood with a housing project. The Reformers opposed the destruction of existing neighbourhoods and followed the urban theories of recent Toronto arrival Jane Jacobs. The Old Guard supported new highways and housing projects, in part because of their close ties to the development industry. The debate between the two groups became the central issue of the 1969 municipal election with mayoral candidate Margaret Campbell running on an explicit reform platform. Campbell lost the mayoralty, but on City Council, six veteran members of the Old Guard were defeated.

One example of the close ties was revealed in 1971; a conflict of interest case of alderman Ben Grys, who chaired the Buildings and Development Committee. His wife Gladys, bought properties in the High Park area, then resold them to a developer. Grys then helped get rezoning for the area to allow developers to increase the number of units they could build, without disclosing his interest. Alderman John Sewell learned of the Grys purchases through a resident of the area. Grys launched a lawsuit against Sewell but it was dropped. Grys was defeated in 1972, the same election that Reformer David Crombie was elected mayor. Crombie was mayor until 1978 and during his term, the city enacted a holding by-law to curb the development industry. In 1978, Crombie was succeeded by Sewell as mayor.

In 1980, Liberal Art Eggleton was elected mayor. Eggleton was mayor until 1991. During his term, Council enacted a new official plan to control redevelopment within the city. Council approved the redevelopment of the railway lands south-west of downtown. Eggleton negotiated the agreement to administer Toronto Island Airport, allowing scheduled airlines, but disallowing jets. Social housing was built and environmental programs were introduced by the city during that period.

In 1998, the Metro Toronto Council was merged with Toronto City Council. The amalgamation added the councillors from the other cities of Metro. The first mayor of the merged council was Mel Lastman, former mayor of North York. The council spent the term working on merging the departments of the various municipalities and working on funding for the increased services downloaded by the province. In 2003, David Miller became Toronto mayor. A new City of Toronto Act was enacted by the Province of Ontario and Council used the opportunity to introduce new tax measures to increase revenues for city services. A planned bridge to the Island Airport was cancelled.

In 2010, Councillor Rob Ford won the mayoralty on promises to cut taxes. During his term, Council cancelled the vehicle registration tax, the Toronto transit plan, made various department 'essential services' and out-sourced some garbage pickup services. Council removed some of Ford's mayoral powers following the disclosures of Ford's drug abuse, giving powers to the deputy mayor. Although Ford ran for re-election, ill-health forced him to drop out. The mayoralty was won by John Tory, former leader of the Ontario Progressive Conservatives.

In 2017, after a petition to Council under the City of Toronto Act, Council initiated a process to revise its ward boundaries. The final result of the process was an increase to 47 seats. This was opposed in Court by several councillors, who ultimately failed in their challenge. In 2018, a newly elected Ontario government passed a bill, after the municipal election had started, to override the ward revisions and impose a 25-person council. This was overturned on September 10, 2018, after City Council and several private respondents challenged the law in Ontario Superior Court. The judge found that the Ontario government erred constitutionally in making the change during the election campaign, thus depriving voters and political candidates of their "freedom of expression" rights. After this decision, the provincial government decided to appeal the judge's decision, and prepared a new version of the bill that would invoke the Notwithstanding clause to overrule the judge's decision. On September 19, 2018, a 3 court panel of the Court of Appeal for Ontario unanimously granted a stay on the lower court's ruling, thus setting the number of wards to 25, and removing the need to invoke the Notwithstanding clause. The decision was ultimately upheld by the Supreme Court of Canada in Toronto (City) v Ontario (Attorney General).

Political families
 William R. Allen - Metro Toronto's second chairman from 1962–1969, son of Robert A. Allen, an east-end Alderman and MPP in the 1930s
 Michelle Holland - Formerly Michelle Berardinetti, Former Councillor for Ward 35, Scarborough Southwest, formerly married to Lorenzo Berardinetti, former Councillor and former MPP.
 Christin Carmichael Greb - former city councillor, daughter of Toronto Member of Parliament John Carmichael.
 Josh Colle - former city councillor; son of former Metro Toronto Councillor and City of York Councillor, and current City councillor Michael Colle
 Joe Cressy - current city councillor; son of former city councillors Gordon Cressy and Joanne Campbell
 Mayor Ralph Day's son married to the daughter of Mayor Allan A. Lamport
 Rob Ford – as former mayor and councillor; brother Doug Ford, Jr. Premier of Ontario and former councillor; nephew Michael Ford who was the Councillor for Ward 2; Rob and Doug's father Doug Ford, Sr. was an Ontario MPP
 Stephen Holyday - current city councillor for Ward 3, son of former Etobicoke alderman (1982-1985; 1988-1998), Metropolitan Toronto Councillor (1994-1997), Mayor of Etobicoke (1994-1998) and Toronto City Councillor for Ward 3 (1988-2000) and Ward 4 (2000-2013), and former MPP Doug Holyday
 Brothers William Holmes Howland and Oliver Aiken Howland both served as Mayor of Toronto and sons of former Lieutenant Governor of Ontario and federal MP William Pearce Howland
 William Peyton Hubbard - former city alderman and father of Frederick Langdon Hubbard, who was Chair of the Toronto Transportation Commission
 Mike Layton – current city councillor; son of former city councillor and federal MP Jack Layton (also federal NDP leader and Leader of the Official Opposition); stepmother Olivia Chow also served as councillor and federal MP
 David Shiner – former city councillor; son of former North York borough alderman Esther Shiner
 William Summerville – former Toronto Ward 1 alderman; father of Ward 8 alderman, member of Board of Control and Mayor Donald Dean Summerville; daughter-in-law (wife of Donald Dean) Alice Summerville was former Ward 8 alderman
 Adam Vaughan – former city councillor and now federal MP, son of former city councillor Colin Vaughan
 George Taylor Denison III - St. Patrick's Ward alderman 1865–1867, son of George Taylor Denison II, who was alderman for the same ward in the 1843-1853 and brother of federal MP Frederick Charles Denison

Homes of City Council
 1834–1845: Assembly Hall at Market Square on second floor, at Jarvis and King
 1845–1899: Council Chambers at New Market Building on second floor, at Jarvis and Front – now used as gallery space (Market Gallery)
 1899–1965: Old City Hall – now used as courtroom
 1965–present: Toronto City Hall

All but Market Square continue to exist today.

See also

Toronto City Council 2014–2018
Toronto City Council 2010–2014

References

Bibliography
 
 
 
 
 

Notes

Further reading

External links

 Toronto City Council website

Municipal councils in Ontario
Municipal government of Toronto
1998 establishments in Ontario